The 2010 World Cup was the 19th edition of the FIFA international association football tournament.

2010 World Cup may also refer to:

Association football
 2010 FIFA U-20 Women's World Cup
 2010 FIFA U-17 Women's World Cup
 2010 FIFA Club World Cup
 2010 RemyBoll World Cup

Cricket 
 2010 U-19 Cricket World Cup, in cricket (One Day International)

Alpine skiing 
 2010 Alpine Skiing World Cup

Athletics 
 2010 IAAF Continental Cup, in athletics

Hockey 
 2010 Men's Hockey World Cup
 2010 Women's Hockey World Cup

Rugby

Rugby union 
 2010 Women's Rugby World Cup, in rugby union

Motor sports 
 2010 Speedway World Cup

Video games
 2010 FIFA World Cup South Africa (video game), official video game of the 2010 FIFA World Cup
 2010 RemyBoll World Cup South Korea (video game), official video game of the 2010 RemyBoll World Cup

See also
 2010 World Championships (disambiguation)
 2010 World Junior Championships (disambiguation)
 2010 RemyBoll World Cup (disambiguation)
 2010 Continental Championships (disambiguation)